Heliades mulleolella is a species of moth of the family Pyralidae. It is found in the south-eastern United States (Florida and Alabama). Records from Arizona refer to Heliades huachucalis.

The wingspan is about 15 mm.

References

Moths described in 1887
Chrysauginae